The Delhi women's cricket team is a women's cricket team that represents the Indian union territory of Delhi. The team competes in the Women's Senior One Day Trophy and the Women's Senior T20 Trophy. The side has won both trophies once apiece.

Notable players
Anjum Chopra
Reema Malhotra

Current squad
Lalita Sharma
Latika Kumari
Arti Dhama
Nirupma Tanwar
Soni Arushi
Kamal Bhabya (wk)
Soni Yadav
Babita Negi (c)
Priya Punia
Shilpa Gupta
Shweta Sehrawat
Vandana Chaturvedi
Neha Chhillar
Mandeep Kaur
Sonia Lohiya

Honours
 Women's Senior One Day Trophy:
 Winners (1): 2011–12
 Runners-up (2): 2009–10, 2017–18
 Women's Senior T20 Trophy:
 Winners (1): 2017–18
 Runners-up (1): 2009–10

See also
 Delhi cricket team

References

Cricket in Delhi
Women's cricket teams in India
Women in Delhi